The Radical European Masters, or REM for short, is a one make sports cars motor racing series launched in 2008.

Radical European Masters cars 
There are two classes in the European Masters, the main class featuring Radical SR8 and Radical RXC Spyders. There is also a supersport class for the Radical SR3.
The SR8 has a 2.7L RPE V8 Engine producing 411 hp with a weight of 725 kg and the RXC Spyder has a Twin turbo 3.5L Ecoboost engine producing 654 hp with a weight of 1010 kg, with the SR3 featuring a tuned and stroked 1.5L Hayabusa engine producing 226 hp with a weight of 620 kg.

Race weekend 
The REM Series in 2008 and 2009  take place during Le Mans Series race weekends. In 2010 Radical Motorsport Deutschland will run the Radical European Masters as an improved racing series. Shell Racing Solutions have joined the Radical European Masters as title sponsor, and will be working closely with Radical in supply the latest racing fuels and lubricants. Primary technical partner Intrax will also attend all European Masters rounds providing technical support, shock absorber dyno services and suspension setup assistance to all competitors. For 2010 Radical European Masters will be known as 2010 Shell Racing Solutions Radical European Masters – In Association With Intrax. Start 2012 Radical European Masters has changed to FIA Radical Masters Euroseries.

The Championship currently supports the International GT Open Series visiting many of Europe's finest circuits such as Silverstone, Spa and Monza.

Champions

References 

European auto racing series
Recurring sporting events established in 2010
One-make series